Hotel Morgen is a studio album by German band To Rococo Rot. It was released in May 2004 under Domino Recording Company.

Track list

References

2004 albums
Domino Recording Company albums
To Rococo Rot albums